Spinneren is a neighbourhood in the city of Kristiansand in Agder county, Norway. The neighborhood is located in the borough of Vågsbygd and in the district of Voiebyen. Spinneren is located along the coast, south of Møvik and north of Kroodden.

References

Geography of Kristiansand
Neighbourhoods of Kristiansand